Events in 1993 in animation.

Events

January
 January 1: The first episode of The Adventures of Blinky Bill airs.
 January 6: The first episode of The Animals of Farthing Wood airs.
 January 14: The Simpsons episode "Marge vs. the Monorail" first airs, guest starring Leonard Nimoy.
 January 21: The Simpsons episode "Selma's Choice" first airs.

February
 February 4: The Simpsons episode "Brother from the Same Planet" first airs.
 February 11: The Simpsons episode "I Love Lisa" first airs.
 February 16: Count Duckula airs its final episode. 
 February 18: The Simpsons episode "Duffless" first airs.
 February 28: The first episode of Bonkers airs.

March
 March 8: The first episode of Beavis and Butt-Head is broadcast.
 March 11: The Simpsons episode "Last Exit to Springfield" first airs, guest starring Joyce Brothers.
 March 16: The first episode of Albert the 5th Musketeer is broadcast.
 March 29: 65th Academy Awards: 
 Mona Lisa Descending a Staircase by Joan C. Gratz wins the Academy Award for Best Animated Short.
 "A Whole New World" from Aladdin by Tim Rice and Alan Menken wins the Academy Award for Best Original Song while its entire soundtrack wins the Academy Award for Best Original Score.

April
 April 1: The Simpsons episode "So It's Come to This: A Simpsons Clip Show" first airs. It is the first episode to feature clips from previous episodes.
 April 15: The Simpsons episode "The Front" first airs.
 April 29: The Simpsons episode "Whacking Day" first airs, in which Superintendent Chalmers debuts; it also guest stars Barry White.

May
 May 6: The Simpsons episode "Marge in Chains" first airs, guest starring David Crosby.
 May 13: The Simpsons episode "Krusty Gets Kancelled" is first broadcast and features the most celebrity guest voices the show has had up to that point in one episode, among them being Johnny Carson, Hugh Hefner, Bette Midler, Luke Perry, Elizabeth Taylor, Barry White and the Red Hot Chili Peppers.

June
 June 18: The film Once Upon a Forest premieres, but flops at the box office.

September
 September 5: The first episode of 2 Stupid Dogs airs.
 September 6: The first episode of Adventures of Sonic the Hedgehog airs.
 September 13: The first episode of Animaniacs airs.
 September 18: The first episodes of Biker Mice from Mars and Rocko's Modern Life  air.
 September 23: The Thief and the Cobbler by Richard Williams is released after being in production for a record-breaking 30 years.
 September 30: The Simpsons episode "Homer's Barbershop Quartet" first airs, guest starring George Harrison and David Crosby as well as the Dapper Dans, who provide the singing voices of The Be Sharps.

October
 October 7: The Simpsons episode "Cape Feare" first airs.
 October 10: A five-year-old boy, Austin Matthews, sets fire to his mother's mobile home in Moraine, Ohio, killing his two-year-old sister Jessica. The mother claims that her son got the idea from watching Beavis and Butt-Head. Although it is later revealed that the family did not have cable television and thus could not watch the show, the controversy led to Beavis and Butt-Head being rescheduled to air later in the evenings and be edited to remove all references to fire.
 October 14: The Simpsons episode "Homer Goes to College" first airs. This was the final episode Conan O'Brien solely wrote before leaving the series to start his talk show.
 October 21: 
 During a U.S. Senate hearing, chairman of the Senate Commerce, Science and Transportation Committee Ernest Fritz Hollings, argues that TV broadcasters have to be pressured to curb violent or otherwise offensive shows, making direct reference to Beavis and Butt-Head. However, he is ridiculed for mispronouncing the characters' names as Buffcoat and Beaver and admitting that he had never watched the show.
 The Simpsons episode "Rosebud" first airs, guest starring The Ramones.
 October 28: The Simpsons episode "Treehouse of Horror IV" first airs.
 October 29: Henry Selick's The Nightmare Before Christmas is released.

November
 November 4: The Simpsons episode "Marge on the Lam" first airs.
 November 11: The Simpsons episode "Bart's Inner Child" first airs, guest starring James Brown. 
 November 18: The Simpsons episode "Boy-Scoutz 'n the Hood" first airs, guest starring Ernest Borgnine. 
 November 24: Dick Zondag, Ralph Zondag, Phil Nibbelink and Simon Wells's We're Back! A Dinosaur's Story is released.

December
 December 9: The Simpsons episode "The Last Temptation of Homer" first airs, guest starring Michelle Pfeiffer and Werner Klemperer.
 December 16: The Simpsons episode "$pringfield (or, How I Learned to Stop Worrying and Love Legalized Gambling)" first airs.
 December 17: Nick Park's Wallace and Gromit short film The Wrong Trousers is released.
 December 21: The first episode of VeggieTales airs.
 December 22: Tex Avery's Magical Maestro is added to the National Film Registry.
 December 25: The film Batman: Mask of the Phantasm is first released.

Specific date unknown
 Digital Domain is founded.
 Rita Street establishes the organization Women in Animation.

Films released

 January 1 - Columbus's Great Adventures (Japan)
 January 16 - Special Gag Force Robot Twins (South Korea)
 January 22 - Offside (Japan)
 January 25 - Al Caral's Legacy (Japan)
 February 10 - Les Mille et Une Farces de Pif et Hercule (France)
 February 24 - Dragon Ball Z: The History of Trunks (Japan)
 March 6:
 Doraemon: Nobita and the Tin Labyrinth (Japan)
 'Dragon Ball Z: Broly – The Legendary Super Saiyan (Japan)
 March 12 - Opera Imaginaire (France)
 March 13 - Mobile Suit SD Gundam Festival (Japan)
 March 18 - Sangokushi (dai 2-bu): Chōkō Moyu! (Japan)
 April 25 - Desert Rose ~ The Snow Apocalypse (Japan)
 May 5 - Ocean Waves (Japan)
 June 5 - Ninja Scroll (Japan)
 June 18 - Once Upon a Forest (United States and United Kingdom)
 July 10:
 Dragon Ball Z: Bojack Unbound (Japan)
 Rail of the Star (Japan)
 July 17 - Soreike! Anpanman Kyōryū Nosshī no Daibōken (Japan)
 July 23:
 Lupin III: Voyage to Danger (Japan)
 Mellow
 July 24:
 Crayon Shin-chan: Action Kamen vs Leotard Devil (Japan)
 Rokudenashi Blues 1993 (Japan)
 July 31 - Fatal Fury 2: The New Battle (Japan)
 August 7 - Patlabor 2: The Movie (Japan)
 August 14 - Tama of 3rd Street: Please! Search for Momo-chan!! (Japan)
 August 27 - The Gigolo - Dochinpira (Japan)
 September 23 - The Thief and the Cobbler (United States, United Kingdom, and Canada)
 September 24 - Mermaid's Scar (Japan)
 September 25:
 Big Wars: Red Zone, Divine Annihilation (Japan)
 Suikoden Demon Century (Japan)
 October 2 - The Halloween Tree (United States)
 October 29 - The Nightmare Before Christmas (United States)
 November 13 - Bonobono (Japan)
 November 24 - We're Back! A Dinosaur's Story (United States)
 December 3 - Oishinbo: Nichibei Kome Sensō (Japan)
 December 5 - Sailor Moon R: The Movie (Japan)
 December 10:
 David Copperfield (Canada)
 Go Hugo Go (Denmark)
 The Secret Adventures of Tom Thumb (United Kingdom)
 December 18:
 Blue Memory: Manmo Pioneers and Boys (Japan)
 Legend of the Galactic Heroes: Overture to a New War (Japan)
 December 19 - Coo: Tōi Umi kara Kita Coo (Japan)
 December 21 - VeggieTales: Where's God When I'm S-Scared? (United States)
 December 23 - Art of Fighting (Japan)
 December 25 - Batman: Mask of the Phantasm (United States)
 December 26 - E.Y.E.S. of Mars (Japan)
 December 29 - Street Fighter (South Korea)
 Specific date unknown:
 The Cat's Mill (Latvia)
 The Fantastic Voyages of Sinbad (Australia)
 The History of the Wonderful World (Denmark)
 Mafalda (Cuba and Spain)
 Puss in Boots (Australia)
 Thumbelina (Australia)

Television series debuts

Television series endings

Births

January
 January 1: Xavier Pritchett, American former child actor (voice of the title character in Little Bill).

March
 March 4: Zach Hadel, American voice actor, internet personality, animator, storyboard artist (SpongeBob SquarePants), background artist, art director, writer and director (co-creator and voice of Charlie, Glep and other various characters in Smiling Friends).

April
 April 4: Daniela Bobadilla, Canadian actress (voice of Miss Martian in Justice League vs. the Fatal Five).
 April 10: Sofia Carson, American actress and singer (voice of Evie in the Descendants franchise, Keemia Marko/Sandgirl in Spider-Man, Maliga in Elena of Avalor, Pipp Petals in My Little Pony: A New Generation).
 April 15: Madeleine Martin, American actress (voice of the title character in JoJo's Circus, Fionna in Adventure Time, additional voices in Ice Age: The Meltdown).

May
 May 10: Spencer Fox, American musician, singer and former child actor (voice of Dash Parr in The Incredibles, Jim and Tim Possible in season 4 of Kim Possible).
 May 14: Miranda Cosgrove, American actress (voice of Margo in the Despicable Me franchise, Kon Suay in Khan Kluay, Samantha in A Mouse Tale, Miranda Wright in the What's New, Scooby-Doo? episode "A Terrifying Round with a Menacing Metallic Clown", Sarah in the Lilo & Stitch: The Series episode "Morpholomew").

June
 June 7: Amanda Leighton, American actress (voice of Blossom in The Powerpuff Girls, Polly Plantar in Amphibia, Poppy in Trolls: The Beat Goes On! and Trolls: TrollsTopia, Angelbit in Unikitty!, Angela in Solar Opposites).
 June 20: Adam Taylor Gordon, American former child actor (voice of Charlie Brown in I Want a Dog for Christmas, Charlie Brown).

July 
 July 6: Fairouz Ai, Japanese voice actress (voice of Hibiki Sakura in How Heavy Are the Dumbbells You Lift?, Jolyne Cujoh in JoJo's Bizarre Adventure: Stone Ocean, Manatsu Natsuumi / Cure Summer in Tropical-Rouge! Pretty Cure).

August 
 August 11: Alyson Stoner, American actress (voice of Isabella Garcia-Shapiro in Phineas & Ferb, Sam Sharp in The Loud House, Destructress in Hamster & Gretel, Florina in Voltron: Legendary Defender, Opal in The Legend of Korra, Batgirl in Young Justice).
 August 24: Aoi Koga, Japanese voice actress (voice of Sora Kaneshiro in Angel's 3Piece!, Yuri Miyata in Two Car, Kaguya Shinomiya in Kaguya-sama: Love Is War, Shoko Komi in Komi Can't Communicate).
 August 26: Keke Palmer, American actress (voice of Peaches in the Ice Age franchise, Aisha in Winx Club, Izzy Hawthorne in Lightyear, Rochelle Hillhurst in Big Mouth and Human Resources, Maya Leibowitz-Jenkins in The Proud Family: Louder and Prouder, Brandi in The Cleveland Show episode "Harder, Better, Faster, Browner", Pam in the Family Guy episode "Baby Got Black", Stylee in the Bubble Guppies episode "Guppy Style!", Fraülen Hapstein in the Robot Chicken episode "Musya Shakhtyorov in: Honeyboogers").
 August 28: Sora Amamiya, Japanese voice actress, singer and YouTuber (voice of Elizabeth Liones in The Seven Deadly Sins, Touka Kirishima in Tokyo Ghoul, Asseylum Vers Allusia in Aldnoah.Zero, Chizuru Mizuhara in Rent-A-Girlfriend, Akame in Akame ga Kill!, Aqua in KonoSuba, Isla in Plastic Memories, Mayuri in Date A Live: The Movie – Mayuri Judgement, Hitomi Uzaki in Killing Bites, Miia in Monster Musume, Ayame Himuro in Science Fell in Love, So I Tried to Prove It, Miko Yotsuya in Mieruko-chan).

October
 October 8: Molly Quinn, American actress (voice of Bloom in Winx Club, Supergirl in Superman: Unbound, Eunice in Ben 10: Ultimate Alien).
 October 25: Zeno Robinson, American voice actor (voice of Alan Albright in the Ben 10 franchise, Hunter in The Owl House, the Green Poncho in Craig of the Creek, Remy Remington in Big City Greens, Cyborg and Steel in Young Justice, Nino Lahiffe and Max Kanté in Miraculous: Tales of Ladybug & Cat Noir, Randy Robertson in Spider-Man, young King Andrias in the Amphibia episode "The Core & the King").

September
 September 7: Taylor Gray, American actor (voice of Ezra Bridger in Star Wars Rebels).
 September 15: James Street, American child actor (second voice of Huckleberry Pie in Strawberry Shortcake), (d. 2007).
 September 18: Taran Kootenhayoo, Canadian actor (voice of Randall and Totem Raiser in Molly of Denali), (d. 2020).
 September 25: Zach Tyler Eisen, American former voice actor (voice of Aang in Avatar: The Last Airbender, Pablo in season 1 of The Backyardigans, Andrew Mulligan in Little Bill, Lucas in The Ant Bully, Baby Red Fish in the Dora the Explorer episode "Fish Out of Water").

November
 November 6: Jak Knight, American television writer, producer (Big Mouth), actor and comedian (voice of DeVon, Tall Guy and Gina's Brother #2 in Big Mouth, Stiles in American Dad!), (d. 2022).

December
 December 17: Kiersey Clemons, American actor (voice of Dee Dee Sykes in Scoob!, Victoria in Michael Jackson's Halloween, Derica in Fairfax).
 December 19: Nik Dodani, American actor, writer, and comedian (voice of Randy Betancourt in Big Nate, Kardez in Strange World, Gavin in The Owl House episode "Through the Looking Glass Ruins").
 December 22: Meghan Trainor, American singer and songwriter (voice of Smurfmelody in Smurfs: The Lost Village, Fairy Godmother in Playmobil: The Movie, guest starred in the SpongeBob SquarePants episode "SpongeBob's Appreciation Day!").
 December 27: Olivia Cooke, English actress (voice of Georgia Nolan in Fireheart, Loch Ness Monster in the Axe Cop episode "Night Mission: The Extincter").
 December 28: Broti Gupta, Indian-American podcaster, television writer, and producer (The Simpsons).

Deaths

February
 February 7: Nic Broca, Belgian animator and comics artist (Ovide and the Gang, The Snorks), dies at age 60.
 February 9: Jacques Verbeek, Dutch animator and comics artist (made animated films with Karin Wiertz), dies at age 46.
 February 21: Harvey Kurtzman, American comics artist, writer, publisher and animation scriptwriter (scripted Mad Monster Party? and animated shorts for Sesame Street), dies at age 68.

March
 March 3: Bill Draut, American comics artist and animator (G.I. Joe), dies at age 71.
 March 10: Vladimir Suteev, Russian children's book novelist, animator and film director (China in Flames), dies at age 89.
 March 14: Larz Bourne, American animation writer (Famous Studios, Gene Deitch, Hanna-Barbera, DePatie-Freleng Enterprises, Terrytoons), dies at age 77.

April
 April 1: Jerry Hausner, American actor (voice of Waldo in Mr. Magoo, Hemlock Holmes, The Mole, Broodles and Itchy in The Dick Tracy Show), dies at age 83.
 April 19: Lee Blair, American artist (Walt Disney Animation Studios), dies at age 81.
 April 20:
 Cantinflas, Mexican comedian, actor and filmmaker (voice of Amigo in Amigo and Friends), dies from lung cancer at age 81.
 Charles Degotte, Belgian comics artist and animator (Dupuis), commits suicide at age 59.

May
 May 3: Hermína Týrlová, Czech animator, screenwriter and film director (Vzpoura Hracek ("Revolt of the Toys")), dies at age 93.
 Specific date unknown: Renaud Mader, aka Mad, French comics artist and animator (Gaumont, Walt Disney Animation), dies at age 26.

June
 June 5: Michael P. Schoenbrun, American production manager (The Simpsons), dies at age 54.
 June 25: Arturo Moreno, Spanish comics artist and animator (Garbancito de la Mancha, Alegres vacaciones), dies at age 84.

July
 July 4: Roman Abelevich Kachanov, Russian animator (Cheburashka), dies at age 72.
 July 11: Mary Moder, American voice actress (voice of Fiddler Pig in Disney's Three Little Pigs shorts), dies at age 87.
 July 21: Robert Glass, American sound engineer (The Simpsons), was stabbed to death at age 53.
 July 26: Marcellite Garner, American voice actress (voiced Minnie Mouse in several cartoons), dies at age 83.

August
 August 1: Claire Du Brey, American actress (model of the Fairy Godmother in Cinderella), dies at age 100.

September
 September 9: David Tendlar, American animator and comics artist (Fleischer Studios, Famous Studios, Terrytoons, Hanna-Barbera), dies at age 84.
 September 10: Cal Howard, American animator, cartoon writer (Walter Lantz, Walt Disney Company, Fleischer Brothers, Ub Iwerks, Warner Bros. Cartoons, Screen Gems) and voice actor (voice of Gabby Goat in Get Rich Quick Porky, Prince David in Gulliver's Travels), dies at age 82.
 September 30: Carlo Vinci, American comics artist and animator (Van Beuren Studios, Terrytoons, MGM, Walt Disney Company, Hanna-Barbera), dies at age 87.

October
 October 13: Otmar Gutmann, German TV producer, animator and director (creator of Pingu), dies from cancer at age 56.
 October 16: Bonnie Poe, American voice actress (continued voice of Betty Boop), dies at age 81.
 October 25: Vincent Price, American actor (voice of January Q. Irontail in Here Comes Peter Cottontail, narrator in Vincent, Vincent Van Ghoul in The 13 Ghosts of Scooby-Doo, Ratigan in The Great Mouse Detective, Edgar Allan Poe in Tiny Toon Adventures, Zigzag in The Thief and the Cobbler), dies at age 82.

November
 November 15: Evelyn Venable, American actress (voice of the Blue Fairy in Pinocchio), dies at age 80.

December
 December 4: Frank Zappa, American rock artist and composer (voice of the Pope in The Ren & Stimpy Show episode "Powdered Toast Man", created background music for the first season of Duckman), dies from cancer at age 52.
 December 10: Roland Davies, English comics artist, animator, animation producer and painter (Roland Davies Films Ltd., animated cartoons based on Come On, Steve), dies at age 89.
 December 13: Ken Anderson, American art director and writer (Walt Disney Animation Studios), dies at age 84.
 December 25: Ann Ronell, American composer and lyricist (co-wrote Who's Afraid of the Big Bad Wolf), dies at age 88.
 December 30: Mack David, American lyricist and songwriter (Cinderella, Alice in Wonderland, The Bugs Bunny Show), dies at age 81.

Specific date unknown
 Nguyễn Xuân Khoát, Vietnamese composer, pianist and animator, dies at age 92 or 93.

See also
1993 in anime

Sources

External links 
Animated works of the year, listed in the IMDb

 
1990s in animation